Juan Tyrone Eichelberger (born October 21, 1953) is an American former Major League Baseball pitcher. He graduated from Balboa High School of San Francisco, California, in 1971, played collegiately at the University of California, Berkeley and pitched for the San Diego Padres (1978–82), Cleveland Indians (1983) and Atlanta Braves (1988). He also pitched one season in Japan (1989) for the Yakult Swallows.

On June 2, 1982, Juan almost threw the Padres first no-hitter against the Chicago Cubs.  A questionable umpiring call resulted in Scot Thompson being credited with a 2nd inning single on a ground ball that was not cleanly fielded by Tim Flannery.  Juan kept the Cubs hitless over the next 7 innings and ended up with a complete game 1 hitter.  The Padres won the game 3–1.

In 1982 he was traded by the Padres along with Broderick Perkins to the Cleveland Indians for Ed Whitson.

In 7 seasons he had a 26–36 win–loss record, 125 games, 79 games started, 14 complete games, 1 shutout, 16 games finished,  innings pitched, 575 hits allowed, 312 runs allowed, 275 earned runs allowed, 50 home runs allowed, 283 walks allowed, 281 strikeouts, 8 hit batsmen, 25 wild pitches, 2,605 batters faced, 20 intentional walks, 14 balks and a 4.10 ERA.  His career WHIP was 1.422.

Eichelberger was known for his unusual set position.  While most pitchers would come to a standing position with their feet together and bring the ball and glove to their chest or chin, Eichelberger would keep his feet spread apart with his knees bent in a crouch and ball and glove at his belt.

Juan Eichelberger's son Jared followed his father into professional baseball, as a RHP originally drafted by the Chicago Cubs in 2001. Juan is the founder and head instructor at Baseball Science, a baseball training program in San Diego, California.

References

External links

Pura Pelota (Venezuelan Winter League)

1953 births
Living people
African-American baseball players
Alexandria Aces players
Amarillo Gold Sox players
American expatriate baseball players in Canada
American expatriate baseball players in Japan
Atlanta Braves players
Baseball players from St. Louis
California Golden Bears baseball players
Cardenales de Lara players
American expatriate baseball players in Venezuela
Cleveland Indians players
Greenville Braves players
Hawaii Islanders players
Major League Baseball pitchers
Miami Marlins (FSL) players
Minor league baseball coaches
Reno Silver Sox players
Richmond Braves players
San Diego Padres players
Sun City Rays players
Tiburones de La Guaira players
University of California, Berkeley alumni
Vancouver Canadians players
West Palm Beach Tropics players
Yakult Swallows players
21st-century African-American people
20th-century African-American sportspeople
Anchorage Glacier Pilots players